Nablus Road (Derekh Shekhem, "Shechem Road") is one of the traditional routes radiating from Jerusalem's walled city. Starting at the Damascus Gate, it is the ancient road north.

Places of interest
 American Colony Hotel
 Armenian Ceramics of Jerusalem-Balian shop
 British Council – Jerusalem office
 Garden Tomb - Christian Protestant site
 Jerusalem Prayer Center (formerly, the Jerusalem House)
 Ministry of Interior (Israel) – Planning Administration office
 National Headquarters of the Israel Police
 Quartet on the Middle East, Office of the Quartet Representative, 54 Nablus Road
 Sheikh Jarrah neighbourhood
 Shimon HaTzadik neighbourhood
 St. John's Eye Hospital
 St. George's Cathedral, seat of the Anglican (Episcopal) Bishop of Jerusalem
 St. George's College, Anglican education centre
 St. George's School, British Anglican boys' school in East Jerusalem
 St. Stephen's Basilica (Saint-Étienne) at the Dominican St. Stephen's Priory
 École Biblique, French biblical and archaeological research centre at St. Stephen's Priory
 Tombs of the Kings archaeological site

See also
 Highway 60 (Israel–Palestine), modern Israeli intercity road connecting, among other places, Jerusalem to Nablus
 Way of the Patriarchs, the main historical north-south route in the area

References

Streets in Jerusalem